The Red Detachment of Women is a Chinese ballet which premiered in 1964 and was made one of the Eight Model Operas which dominated the national stage during the Cultural Revolution. It is best known in the West as the ballet performed for U.S. President Richard Nixon on his visit to China in February 1972.

Background and development
Adapted from the earlier 1961 film of the same title under the personal direction of Zhou Enlai, which in turn adapted from the novel by Liang Xin, it depicts the liberation of a peasant girl in Hainan Island and her rise in the Chinese Communist Party.  The novel was based on the true stories of the 100+ member strong all-female Special Company of the 2nd Independent Division of Chinese Red Army, first formed in May 1931.  As the communist base in Hainan was destroyed by the nationalists, most of the members of the female detachment survived, partially because they were women and easier to hide among the local populace who were sympathetic to their cause. After the communist victory in China, the representatives of the surviving members were taken to Beijing and personally inspected and praised by Mao Zedong. In 2014, Lu Yexiang, the last member of red detachment of women, died in Qionghai, Hainan.

The ballet was later adapted to a Beijing opera in 1964, and as with the ballet itself, both stage and film versions were produced. The 1970 film version of the ballet made Xue Jinghua (as Wu Qinghua) and Liu Qingtang (as Hong Changqing) superstars along with a dozen other artists who were cast as protagonists in other model plays of the time. It is one of the so-called eight model plays in China during the Cultural Revolution (1966–1976). With The White Haired Girl, it is regarded as a revolutionary Chinese ballet, and its music is familiar to almost every Chinese person who grew up during that time. It was made into a film in 1972 again, and is now part of the permanent repertoire of the National Ballet of China. It remains a favorite of music and ballet lovers nearly 30 years after the Cultural Revolution in China. It is often performed for international women's day. 

It was collaboratively created by: with music by Du Mingxin, Wu Zuqiang, Wang Yanqiao, Shi Wanchun and Dai Hongwei, and choreography by Li Chengxiang, Jiang Zuhui and Wang Xixian. Many numbers were based on the folk songs of Hainan Island, a place that, with its coconut trees rustling in tropical wind, evokes much romantic ethos. Though there are unmistakable elements of Chinese music, the music of this ballet was performed with basically a Western symphony orchestra.

On 25 December 2015 Chinese Choreographer Wen Hui, the German Director and Dramaturge Kai Tuchmann, and the author Zhuang Jiayun premiered their work RED at the Power Station of Art in Shanghai. RED is a reinterpretation of The Red Detachment of Women and it analyses this model opera/ballet as a politico-cultural symbol that became part of the collective consciousness during the Cultural Revolution. Since its premiere in China, RED is touring around Asia and Europe.

Synopsis 

Place: Yelinzhai ("Stronghold of the coconut woods"), Hainan Island, China
Time: The Ten-Year Civil War (1927-1937)

Main Characters:

Hong Changqing, Commissar of the Red Detachment of Women
Wu Qinghua, daughter of a peasant, later a soldier, and finally the Commissar
Lian Zhang, literally the Company Commander
Xiao Pang, or "Little Pang," the Messenger
Nanbatian, literally "the Tyrant of the South"
Ou Guangsi (Lao Si), Nanbatian's Lackey

Prologue

In his dungeon, Nanbatian, the despotic landlord, has imprisoned his tenants who are unable to pay their exorbitant rents. Wu Qinghua, daughter of a poor peasant, is chained to a column. Lao Si comes with the order of Nanbatian to sell Wu. Lao Si releases Wu from the chain. While Lao Si is in an unguarded moment, Wu kicks him, and he loses his balance and falls. Wu manages to escape while two other inmates hold Lao Si to the ground.

Major numbers:

 Pas de deux of two inmates

Act I

Immediately after the prologue. Night has fallen in the coconut forest and Wu Qinghua is desperately running away from Lao Si and his lackeys. She is soon recaptured. Nanbatian and his entourage arrive. The Tyrant whips Wu until she loses consciousness. A thunderstorm approaches, so Nanbatian and his followers leave and Wu is left for dead.

Hong Changqing, the Commissar, and Xiao Pang, the Messenger, who are on a reconnaissance mission in disguise, pass by. They save Wu and point her the way to the camp of the Red Army.

Major numbers:

 Dance of Lao Si and his lackeys
 Wu Qinghua's Solo No. 1
 Wu Qinghua's fight with Lao Si
 Wu Qinghua's fight with Nanbatian
 Group dance of slaves
 Wu Qinghua's Solo No. 2
 Pas de trois of Hong Changqing, Wu Qinghua and Xiao Pang

Act II

In the camp of the Red Army beside the Wanquan River, a newly formed Detachment of Women is being trained. Wu Qinghua arrives to meet Hong Changqing and Xiao Pang, who introduce her to others. In a solo dance, Wu tells the Red Army soldiers the enormity of Nanbatian's crimes. She then ceremoniously receives a rifle and is accepted as a member of the Women's Detachment. With determination, they plan to liberate the peasants and slave girls under the oppression of Nanbatian.

Major numbers:

 Group dance of the Detachment members
 Rifle drill of the Detachment members
 Hong Changqing's bayonet dance
 Group bayonet dance of the Detachment members
 A young women soldier's solo
 Five-inch dagger dance of the Red Guards
 Group dance of all
 Wu Qinghua's solo

Act III

In the luxurious manor of Nanbatian, an extravagant birthday celebration for the Tyrant is going on in the garden before his house. Mountains of gifts are brought in; visitors are arriving, Li girls are driven in with whips at their backs to dance for the guests.

Hong Changqing, disguised as a wealthy merchant from southeast Asia, arrives on the scene, calm and dignified, to congratulate Nanbatian on his birthday. Meanwhile, the members of the Women's Detachment have secretly gathered around the manor of the Tyrant. It has been agreed that Hong is to fire his gun at midnight as signal for the Detachment to break in to wipe out the Tyrant and his gang in one fell swoop.

At night, all people recede into the houses. Nanbatian comes out to see some of his guests off. Overcome by deep personal hatred, Wu Qinghua shoots Nanbatian, prematurely issuing the battle signal. Nanbatian is merely wounded and escapes from a secret tunnel with a few of his lackeys.

Nanbatian's prisons are opened, and the prisoners are liberated. Hong leads them in opening the granary of the Tyrant and distributing the grain.

Wu is reprimanded for her blunder, and her gun is removed from her.

Major numbers:

 Group dance of slaves
 Li Girls' dance
 Broadsword dance of Nanbatian's lackeys
 Xiao Pang's solo
 Pas de deux of Wu Qinghua and her comrade-in-arm
 Opening the granary and distributing grain

Act IV

Back in the camp of the Red Army. Hong Changqing, the Commissar, is giving a lecture to the soldiers in the early morning. Wu Qinghua comes to grips with her mistake. Hong and the Company Commander are pleased to see Wu's progress. The Company Commander returns the gun to her, and together they practice marksmanship and grenade throwing.

The local people visit the Red Army and present them with doulis and lichees.

Suddenly, the sound of cannons is heard and Xiao Pang, the Messenger, arrives on horseback with the information that Nanbatian has assembled a large number of troops, and they are on their way to attack the base of the Red Army. The members of the Detachment immediately bid goodbye to their dear ones and set out to the battle field.

Major numbers:

 Hong Changqing's solo
 Group dance of the soldiers
 Wu Qinghua's solo
 Pas de deux of Wu Qinghua and Company Commander No. 1
 Dance of five female soldiers and the head cook
 Douli Dance
 Pas de deux of Wu Qinghua and Company Commander No. 2
 Dance of Hong Changqing and male soldiers
 Group dance of all

Act V

On the battlefield at a mountain pass. In order to annihilate the enemy's effective power, the main force of the Red Army strategically shifts to the rear of the enemy, and the Company Commander leads most of the members of the Detachment in moving away with the main force. Hong Changqing and a small group of Red Army soldiers and Red Guards form a covering force to divert the enemy. After a series of fierce fights, the goal is achieved.

As they prepare to withdraw, the enemy starts yet another attack. Hong gives his portfolio to Wu Qinghua and orders her and other members to retreat while he and only two other soldiers stay behind to fend off the enemy.

Hong's two comrades-in-arms are killed and he himself is captured.

Major numbers:

 Dance of Wu Qinghua and other soldiers
 Wu Qinghua's fight with an enemy
 Fight between two soldiers and two enemies
 Red flag dance
 Dance of Hong Changqing and two comrades-in-arm
 Dance of Hong Changqing and two enemies

Entr'acte

The main force of the Red Army is pressing forward with the momentum of an avalanche. Their group dance.

A memorable moment in the entr'acte is the precisely synchronized grand jete of the Red Army soldiers crossing the stage in a seemingly endless line, vividly suggesting they are as fast as an arrow flying in the air.

Major numbers:

 Group dance of the Red Army soldiers
 Sequence of synchronized grand jeté

Act VI

In the lair of the Tyrant, Nanbatian and his lackeys are panic-stricken knowing that their end is approaching. The Tyrant runs out all his means to force Hong Changqing to surrender, but the Commissar vehemently denounces the enemy. Nanbatian threatens Hong with death, but the hero remains steadfast. At the end, Hong is burnt in a horrid fire under the giant banyan tree amidst a chorus of the Internationale, and he dies a martyr's death.

The main force of the Red Army has won their battle with the enemy. They storm the hideout of the Tyrant and kill him and his lackeys.

The Red Army emancipates Nanbatian's prisoners and Yelinzhai is liberated.

Wu Qinghua and the Company Commander look everywhere for Hong and find the truth. They all kneel in front of the place where Hong has died to pay their respects to the hero.

The Red Army Battalion Commander announces that Wu will succeed Hong as the Commissar of the Women's Detachment. Wu takes over Hong's portfolio, and she and her comrades-in-arm will continue their revolutionary cause.

Major numbers:

 Dance of Nanbatian and Lao Si
 Hong Changqing's solo
 Hong Changqing dying a martyr's death
 Red Army's assault on Nanbatian's lair
 Celebration of liberation
 Pas de deux of Wu Qinghua and Company Commander
 Mourning the martyr
 Group dance and the tableau vivant at the end

In popular culture 
Images of dancers performing The Red Detachment of Women appear as a theme in the work of visual artists Hung Liu, who grew up in Changchun China but settled in Oakland California. The French film The Chinese in Paris has a six minute long "play-within-a-play", that hybridizes the ballet The Red Detachment of Women with the French opera Carmen, calling the production "Carmeng".

See also

 List of ballets by title
 Nixon in China opera

References 
 Specific

 General
 Zhongguo Wuju Tuan. RED DETACHMENT OF WOMEN—A Modern Revolutionary Ballet. Beijing Foreign Language Press, 1972.
 Zhongguo Wuju Tuan. Red Detachment of Women (Choreographic Work). Beijing Foreign Language Press, 1973.
 Günter Platzdasch in Frankfurter Allgemeine Zeitung: Stehender Kranich im Frauenbataillon - Von Yenan nach Jena https://www.faz.net/aktuell/feuilleton/buehne-und-konzert/kunstfest-weimar-wen-huis-ballett-red-in-jena-15183178.html

External links 
 Youtube: Red Detachment of Women (1971, full movie, good-quality soundtrack)
 Archive: Red Detachment of Women (1971, full movie)
 Some Stills from Red Detachment of Women
 YouTube: Qinghua Joins the Red Army in Act II
 YouTube: Happy Soldiers in Act IV
 YouTube: The Douli Dance in Act IV

Ballet in China
Propaganda in China
1964 ballet premieres
Maoist China propaganda
Hainan in fiction